The Directorate General of Civil Aviation or the Directorate General of Civil Aeronautics of Chile is the civil aviation authority of Chile. It has its headquarters in Providencia, Santiago.

The body is presided by a general director, and organised into twelve Departments and a Directorate of Meteorology.  Apart from overseeing all aspects of civil aviation within the Chilean territory, it provides additional services not directly related to regulating and controlling the civil aviation industry, such as meteorological services for navigational purposes. , the General Director is Air Mshl Victor Villalobos Collao.

The Departamento de Prevención de Accidentes investigates air accidents and incidents.

See also

List of civil aviation authorities

References

External links
 

Chile
Aviation organisations based in Chile
Government agencies of Chile
Organizations investigating aviation accidents and incidents
1930 establishments in Chile
Government agencies established in 1930
Civil aviation in Chile